Action Cycling Team is a Taiwanese UCI Continental cycling team established in 2010.

Team roster

Major wins
2012
Stage 2 Tour of Singkarak, Shih Hsin Hsiao

References

UCI Continental Teams (Asia)
Cycling teams established in 2010
Cycling teams based in Taiwan